Tulio Bagatini Marotti (born 22 May 1995), commonly known as Tulhão, is a Brazilian footballer who currently plays as a right back for Levico Terme.

Club career
Having started his career at local side Velo Clube in Brazil, Tulhão moved to Italy in 2014 to sign with A.C. Este, before moving to Trapani Calcio the following year. He was loaned to Serie D side San Marino in early 2016. After an unsuccessful loan spell with Lega Pro side Lucchese, he was swapped for Federico Brusacà in early 2017.

He was called up as part of the Serie D Representatives side for the 2015 Torneo di Viareggio.

Personal life
Born in Brazil, Tulhão is of Italian descent and holds an Italian passport.

Career statistics

Club

Notes

References

External links
 Profile at Lumezzane

1995 births
Living people
People from Rio Claro, São Paulo
Brazilian people of Italian descent
Brazilian footballers
Brazilian expatriate footballers
Association football defenders
Trapani Calcio players
A.S.D. Victor San Marino players
F.C. Lumezzane V.G.Z. A.S.D. players
Serie C players
Serie D players
Brazilian expatriate sportspeople in Italy
Expatriate footballers in Italy
Footballers from São Paulo (state)